Inis Mór Aerodrome  is located  southeast of Kilronan, a town on the island of Inis Mór, one of the Aran Islands off the coast of County Galway in Ireland. It has one paved runway designated 14/32 which measures .

Service to Connemara Airport is provided by Aer Arann Islands, an airline which also serves the other Aran Islands: Inis Oírr and Inis Meáin.

In 2018, the airline announced its intention to cease operations at the airport, but an agreement was reached to continue the service, and the service continued to operate as of 2020.

Airlines and destinations

Statistics

References

External links

 
 Aviation photos for Inishmore (IOR / EIIM) at Airliners.net

Airports in the Republic of Ireland
Transport in County Galway